The 2006 UEFA Super Cup was the 31st edition of the annual UEFA Super Cup, a UEFA-sponsored football club match that pitted the winners of the UEFA Champions League against the winners of the UEFA Cup. It took place at the Stade Louis II in Monaco, on 25 August 2006, and featured two Spanish clubs: Barcelona, who won the 2005–06 UEFA Champions League, against Sevilla, who took the 2005–06 UEFA Cup title. Sevilla beat Barcelona by 3–0 and added its first UEFA Super Cup trophy to its maiden UEFA Cup.

Match

Background
For the third time, two clubs from the same country played each other in the UEFA Super Cup, after the all-Italian 1990 and 1993 editions. Barcelona guaranteed a sixth presence in the UEFA Super Cup match, following their victorious campaign in the 2005–06 UEFA Champions League, where they defeated first-time finalists Arsenal by 2–1, at the Stade de France in Paris. Their first three presences—as 1979, 1982 and 1989 UEFA Cup Winners' Cup winners—resulted in an equal number of defeats. Having won their first European Cup title in 1992, Barcelona finally claimed the Super Cup trophy in their fourth attempt by beating Werder Bremen 3–2 on aggregate. Five years later, as 1997 UEFA Cup Winners' Cup holders they defeated another German club (Borussia Dortmund) to add a second Super Cup to their cabinet.

Spanish side Sevilla made their debut in the UEFA Super Cup by taking the 2005–06 UEFA Cup title with a 4–0 win over Middlesbrough in the final, held at the Philips Stadion in Eindhoven. This triumph was achieved in Sevilla's sixth participation in the UEFA Cup tournament, following participations in the 1982–83, 1983–84, 1990–91, 1995–96 and 2004–05 editions.

Before the 2006 UEFA Super Cup, the two clubs had previously met in European competition only once. It was in the third round of the 1995–96 UEFA Cup edition, and it resulted in a 4–2 aggregate win for Barcelona.

Details

Statistics

See also
2005–06 UEFA Champions League
2005–06 UEFA Cup
2015 UEFA Super Cup – contested between same teams
FC Barcelona in international football competitions
Sevilla FC in European football
Spanish football clubs in international competitions

References

Super Cup
2006 in Monégasque sport
2006
Super Cup 2006
Super Cup 2006
2006–07 in Spanish football
International club association football competitions hosted by Monaco
August 2006 sports events in Europe